Caterina Sforza (1463 – 28 May 1509) was an Italian noblewoman, the Countess of Forlì and Lady of Imola, firstly with her husband Girolamo Riario, and after his death as a regent of her son Ottaviano. Caterina was a noblewoman who lived a life maintaining her responsibilities with her family and power as a ruler in the courts. Her status and image was shaped by the masculine and feminine roles she took on throughout her lifetime as a ruler, wife, widow, and mother, in addition to the cultural activities she participated in during Renaissance Italy.

The descendant of a dynasty of noted condottieri, from an early age, Caterina distinguished herself through her bold and impetuous actions taken to safeguard her possessions from possible usurpers and to defend her dominions from attack, when they were involved in political intrigues. In her private life, Caterina was devoted to various activities, including experiments in alchemy and a love of hunting, dancing, and horse riding. She was educated and engaged in religious rituals and matters, commissioned works of art, a fashion icon, and was a collector of many jewels and clothing. In addition, she undertook urban, residential, and military architectural projects.

While her role as a ruler was considered to be masculine, Caterina had series of portrait medals that embodied her diplomatic skills and political power as a successful regent. At the time, portrait medals were important among the noble society and could be distributed and exchanged as a way to communicate self-presentation, characteristic, and accomplishments of that person. Caterina's first medal represented her beauty, womanly virtue, and conformity to the female role as a noble wife and mother. When Girolamo died, Caterina's next medal represented loyalty and protection of her family with her new position as a chaste widow. While it was feminine, it was also clearly masculine because it represented her additional powerful position as a regent.

She had many children, but only the youngest, Captain Giovanni delle Bande Nere, inherited his mother's forceful, militant personality. Caterina's resistance to Cesare Borgia meant she had to face his fury and imprisonment. After she gained her freedom in Rome, she then went on to lead a quiet life in Florence. In the final years of her life, she confided to a monk: "Se io potessi scrivere tutto, farei stupire il mondo" ("If I could write everything that happened, I would shock the world").

Life

Childhood
Caterina Sforza was born in Milan in 1463. She was one of the illegitimate children of Galeazzo Maria Sforza and his mistress Lucrezia Landriani who was wife to Count Gian Piero Landriani. The Count was a courtier of the Milanese ducal court and a close friend to Galeazzo. In her early years, Caterina spent her time under the care of her mother's side of the family. The bond she had with her mother Lucrezia never faltered. She followed Caterina's growing years and stayed close during crucial moments of her life, even during her final years in Florence.

Following the death of Francesco, Caterina's paternal grandfather, and the succession of her father Galeazzo Maria Sforza as Duke of Milan in 1466, Caterina and her siblings were brought to court. All four of Lucrezia Landriani's children were entrusted to Bianca Maria Visconti, Caterina's paternal grandmother. The year of his succession, the Duke had married Dorotea Gonzaga. By 1468, Dorotea had passed away and on May 9 the Duke remarried to Bona of Savoy who adopted all four children. Carlo, born in 1461 would later become Count of Magenta. Alessandro, born in 1465 would later become Lord of Francavilla. Chiara, born in 1467 would become Countess dal Verme di Sanguinetto through her first marriage, and Lady of Novi by her second.

Caterina and her siblings received a humanistic education while exposed to writers and artists at the Sforza court. Being part of an Italian noble family during this time meant she would receive the same education as her brothers. She benefited from learning Latin and reading classic works of the time. From her paternal grandmother, she learned to take pride in her warlike ancestors, to show boldness in the use of arms, and astuteness in the skill of government. From Bona, she received not only maternal warmth and affection, which the adoptive mother poured over all her husband's children, but also a potential first introduction to the world of botanical pharmaceuticals. Bona entered court with her personal apothecary, Cristoforo de Brugora, a line of work Caterina would explore later in life through her experiments. Her relationship with Bona would continue through correspondence after Caterina left the Milanese court. 

Caterina's father, whose family resided in Milan and Pavia, was a devoted hunter and often stayed either at Galliate or Cusago. It is believed that between these two locations, her own passion for hunting was acquired.

First marriage

In 1473, Caterina became betrothed to Girolamo Riario, the son of Paolo Riario and Bianca della Rovere, sister of Pope Sixtus IV (in office: 1471–1484). Caterina replaced her cousin, the 11-year-old Costanza Fogliani, as Girolamo's bride because, according to some historians, Costanza's mother Gabriella Gonzaga (illegitimate daughter of Marquis Ludovico III of Mantua) refused to allow the consummation of the marriage until Costanza reached the legal age—then 14—while Caterina, although only ten years old at that time, agreed with the demands of the groom; other sources instead reported that the marriage of Caterina and Girolamo was celebrated on 17 January 1473, but consummated four years later (1477) when Caterina reached the age of fourteen, without giving further details about the broken betrothal with Costanza.

Pope Sixtus IV gave Girolamo the Lordship of Imola, already a Sforza city, but at the time a fief of the Riario family. Caterina was a part of the two richest courts in Italy after marrying Girolamo and being daughter to the Duke of Milan. After a triumphal entrance into Imola in 1477, Caterina went to Rome with her husband, where he lived for many years in the service of his uncle, the Pope. On 1 September 1479, Caterina gave birth to her first child, a son she named Ottaviano. More children with Girolamo would follow: Cesare on 25 August 1480, Bianca (her only daughter) at the end of October 1481, Giovanni Livio at the end of October 1484, Galeazzo on 18 December 1485, and Francesco (called Sforzino) on 17 August 1487.

In the Vatican court
At the end of the 15th century, Rome was no longer a medieval city, but not yet the important centre of artistic endeavors it would become a few decades later as one of the most important cities of the Renaissance. Upon her arrival in May 1477, Caterina found a city full of cultural fervour, with a desire for renovation.

The atmosphere was a mix of intrigue and power, which was pursued without scruples, with material interests far exceeding the spiritual. Caterina was banned by her husband from meddling in politics, but she quickly integrated—owing to her extroverted and sociable character—into aristocratic Roman society.

As evidenced by correspondence from that period, Caterina immediately became admired as one of the most beautiful and elegant among noble Roman women. She was welcomed everywhere, treated with great respect and lavishly praised by all of society including the Pope, and she soon transformed from a simple adolescent into a refined and powerful intermediary between the Roman court and other Italian courts, especially Milan.

Girolamo was given a leading position in the expansion policy of Pope Sixtus IV after the premature death of the Pope's favoured nephew, Cardinal Pietro Riario. His power grew daily, and he soon displayed increasing ruthlessness towards his enemies. In 1480, the Pope, with the objective of attaining a strong domain in the land of Romagna, assigned Girolamo the lordship of Forlì, which had remained vacant after it was sequestered from the Ordelaffi family. The new lord tried to earn the favour of the populace by erecting magnificent public buildings and churches, and by abolishing taxes.

The lives of Caterina and Girolamo changed abruptly with the death of Sixtus IV on 12 August 1484.

Occupation of Castel Sant'Angelo
When Pope Sixtus IV died, Girolamo made many enemies in Rome. Therefore, rebellions and disorder immediately spread through Rome, including looting of his supporters' residences. Girolamo's residence, the Orsini palace in Campo de' Fiori, was stripped of its contents and almost destroyed.

In this time of anarchy, Caterina, who was in her seventh month of pregnancy, crossed the Tiber on horseback to occupy the rocca (fortress) of Castel Sant'Angelo on behalf of her husband. From this position and with the obedience of the soldiers, Caterina could monitor the Vatican and dictate the conditions for the new conclave.

Meanwhile, the disorder in the city increased. A militia accompanied the arrival of the cardinals. The latter did not want to attend the funeral of Sixtus IV and refused to enter into conclave, for fear of coming under the fire of Caterina's artillery. The situation was difficult because only the election of a new Pope would put an end to the violence in Rome. Unsuccessful attempts to persuade her to leave the fortress failed, as she was determined to give it only to the new Pope, saying that Pope Sixtus had bestowed its control to her family.

Girolamo and his army occupied a strategic position at that point, yet could not implement an effective solution. The Sacred College asked Girolamo to leave Rome, offering in return the confirmation of his lordship over Imola and Forlì, the military post of captain-general of the Church, and 8,000 ducats in compensation for the damages to his property. Girolamo accepted. When Caterina was informed of the decisions taken by her husband, she increased the quota of her soldiers and made preparations for resistance in order to force the cardinals to parley with her. The cardinals again approached Girolamo, who took up a position against his wife. On 25 October 1484, Caterina surrendered the fortress to the Sacred College and left Rome with her family. The Sacred College were then able to meet in conclave to elect the new Pope.

Forlì
In Forlì, law and order had been maintained by Caterina's uncle Ludovico il Moro Sforza, Duke of Milan. On their arrival, the Riarios learned of the election of Giovanni Battista Cybo, an old opponent, as Pope Innocent VIII. He confirmed Girolamo in his lordships of Imola and Forlì and his appointment as captain-general. That appointment, however, was only nominal; Girolamo had no real control over the papal army and Innocent VIII refused to pay Girolamo for leaving Rome.

Despite the loss of income, Girolamo did not reinstate taxes on the people of Forlì.

This situation lasted until the end of 1485, when the city government completely ran out of money. Girolamo, pressed by a member of the Council of Elders, Nicolò Pansecco, was forced to levy taxes. The taxes were deemed excessive by the population and led to Girolamo's increased unpopularity among all citizens of Forlì.

The tax increase, which affected mainly craftsmen and landowners, added to the discontent that had previously been limited to the families who had suffered under Girolamo's persecution of those whom he suspected of treachery. His enemies began to conspire against him with a view to making Franceschetto Cybo, the illegitimate son of Pope Innocent, lord of Imola and Forlì in his stead.

Girolamo's death
After more than a half dozen failed attempts, Girolamo was killed on 14 April 1488 by a conspiracy led by the Orsis, a noble family of Forlì. The lord's palace was sacked, while Caterina and her six children were made prisoners.

The fortress of Ravaldino, a central part of the defensive system of the city, refused to surrender to the Orsis. Caterina offered to attempt to persuade the castellan, Tommaso Feo, to submit. The Orsis believed Caterina because she left her children as hostages, but once inside she let loose a barrage of vulgar threats and promises of vengeance against her former captors. According to one rumour, when they threatened to kill her children, Caterina, standing in the walls of the fortress exposed her genitals and said: "" ('Do it, if you want to: hang them even in front of me ... here I have what's needed to make others!'). This story, however, is most likely an untrue embellishment. The historical record tells that Caterina, in fact, said she was pregnant. Although her statement that she was pregnant is, by most historians, considered to have been a ruse, it rendered worthless any power the conspirators had in holding her children, Girolamo's legitimate heirs.

Shocked by this response, the Orsis did not dare touch the Riario children. With the assistance of her uncle Ludovico il Moro (very interested in securing some influence in the Romagna, to counter the influence of Venice), Caterina defeated her enemies and regained possession of her dominions.

Lady of Imola and Forlì
On 30 April 1488, Caterina became regent of Forlì for her eldest son Ottaviano, formally recognized by all the members of the Comune and the head of the magistrates as the new Lord of Forlì that day, but too young to exercise power directly. In a patriarchal society, women were considered irrational and vulnerable. Thus, regency was considered problematic because of the masculine role that the widow had to take on as a ruler. Nonetheless, Caterina defied the social and cultural barriers that society put on female regents and became known for her successful role as a regent for twelve years.

Caterina's first act as Regent of Forlì was to avenge the death of her husband, according to the custom of the time. She ordered that all those involved in the Orsi conspiracy were to be imprisoned, along with the Pope's governor, Monsignor Savelli, all the pontifical generals, and the castellan of the fortress of Forlimpopoli, and also all women of the Orsis and other families who had assisted in the conspiracy. Soldiers sought out all who had taken part in the conspiracy. Houses owned by those imprisoned were razed while their valuables were distributed to the poor.

On 30 July news came that Pope Innocent VIII had given Ottaviano Riario the official investiture of his state "until his line ended". In the meantime, Forlì was visited by Cardinal Raffaele Riario, officially to protect the orphan children of his late cousin Girolamo but actually, to oversee the government of Caterina.

The young Countess personally dealt with all issues concerning the government of her city-state, both public and private. To consolidate her power, she exchanged gifts with the lords of neighbouring states and involved herself in marriage negotiations for her children. She decreased taxes by reducing some and eliminating others, and sharply controlled her realm's spending. Caterina dealt directly with the training of her militia in the use of weapons and horses. It was her intention that her cities and towns be orderly and peaceful, and she expected her subjects to appreciate these efforts.

The states of Forlì and Imola were smaller than the great Italian states but, due to their geographical position, had a considerable strategic importance on the political affairs. In those years there were significant events that changed the geopolitical situation of Italy. Lorenzo il Magnifico, whose shrewd policy had curbed claims and rivalries of the various Italian states,  died on 8 April 1492. Pope Innocent VIII also died on 25 July of that year, and was replaced by Cardinal Rodrigo Borgia, who took the name of Pope Alexander VI. His election seemed to strengthen Caterina's rule. While she and her husband had lived in Rome, the Cardinal had often been a guest at their home, and he was godfather to Ottaviano.

These events directly threatened the stability and peace in Italy. With the death of Lorenzo there came about friction between the Duchy of Milan and the Kingdom of Naples, leading up to the crisis of September 1494, when, incited by Ludovico il Moro, King Charles VIII of France entered into Italy to claim the Kingdom of Naples as the Anjou heir. At first Pope Alexander VI also gave his support to Charles's claim, leading to four years of war.

During the conflict between Naples and Milan, Caterina, who knew that she was placed in a strategic position of passage for anyone who wanted to go to the south, tried to remain neutral. She knew Forlì was exposed to invasion, located in a strategic position on the way to Rome. On one side, her uncle Ludovico had allied with Charles VIII; on the other side, Pope Alexander VI now opposed France's ambitions in Italy, and her brother-in-law, Cardinal Raffaele Riario, argued in favour of the incumbent King of Naples.

After a meeting on 23 September 1494, Caterina was persuaded by the Duke of Calabria Ferrandino d'Aragona to support King Alfonso II of Naples and prepared to defend Imola and Forlì.

To cause the break between the two was then the so-called sack of Mordano, which took place between 20 and 21 October: around the city of Mordano they had gathered between fourteen thousand to sixteen thousand French to encircle it with siege and at the same time to trap Ferrandino, who having a smaller number of men would almost certainly have been defeated. He therefore, understanding the situation, on the advice of his generals decided not to respond to the countess's requests for help. Caterina, very angry, considered herself betrayed by the Neapolitan allies and passed on the side of the French, who had devastated her lands and massacred her subjects, therefore Ferrandino, having learned the news, under a relentless downpour was forced to leave Faenza with his men and move in the direction of Cesena.

Note in this regard the chronicler forlivese Leone Cobelli that, while Ferrandino always behaved honestly, Caterina sent men behind him to rob him, albeit unsuccessfully:

Charles VIII, however, preferred to avoid the Romagna and cross the Apennines, following the road of the Cisa pass. The Kingdom of Naples was conquered by the French army in only 13 days. This frightened the Italian principalities, and they formed the League of Venice against Charles VIII. Despite the numerical advantage of their opponents, the French won the engagement and Charles was able to march his army out of Italy.The numerical superiority of the Italian coalition served little purpose, the end of the day, due to a lack of organization and the ineffective use of light cavalry and infantry Fornovo and the  French Kind was able to withdraw to France.
This time, Caterina managed to remain neutral. By not participating in the expulsion of the French, she maintained the support of both her uncle Ludovico in Milan (now legitimate Duke of Milan) and also that of the Pope.

Second marriage
Two months after the death of Girolamo, a rumour was spread that Caterina was close to marrying Antonio Maria Ordelaffi, who had started to court her. This marriage would end the claims of the Ordelaffi family on the city of Forlì. Antonio Maria, feeling confident, wrote to the Duke of Ferrara that the Countess promised to marry him. When Caterina saw how things stood, she imprisoned those who had spread the false news. These promises were addressed by the Senate in Venice, which summoned Antonio Maria to Friuli, where he remained confined for ten years.

Instead, Caterina had fallen in love with Giacomo Feo, the brother of Tommaso Feo, the Girolamo's former courtiers and castellan who had remained faithful to her after the assassination of her husband. However, Giacomo was not educated or a noble. Caterina knew not to make it publicly known that she remarried after Girolamo's death. Therefore, Caterina secretly married Giacomo in 1488 to avoid losing custody of her children and the regency of her dominions.

All the contemporary chronicles reported that Caterina was madly in love with the young Giacomo. It was feared that she could strip her son Ottaviano of his future lordship, in order to give it to her lover and secret husband.

Giacomo was appointed castellan of the fortress of Ravaldino in place of his brother, and was awarded with an order of chivalry from Ludovico il Moro. In April 1489, Caterina gave birth to Giacomo's son, Bernardino, later called Carlo in honour of King Charles VIII, who had made Giacomo a baron of France. Also, she had replaced the castellans of the fortresses of her dominions with her closest relatives: the fortress of Imola was given to Gian Piero Landriani, her stepfather, and the fortress of Forlimpopoli to Piero Landriani, her half-brother, while Tommaso Feo was married to Bianca Landriani, Caterina's half-sister.

At Tossignano, a conspiracy was formed to seize the fortress in the name of Ottaviano, and murder both Giacomo and Caterina. The Countess discovered the plot and imprisoned or executed those who were involved. Immediately after this conspiracy was foiled, another plot was organized by Antonio Maria Ordelaffi, who had never become resigned to the loss of Forlí, but this also failed.

Giacomo's power increased, and with his cruelty and insolence he incurred the hatred of all, including Caterina's children. On one occasion, in full view of the public, he slapped Ottaviano (the rightful Lord of Forlì), but nobody had the courage to defend the boy. After this incident, adherents of Ottaviano decided to liberate the city from the domination of Giacomo Feo. In addition, Caterina's people began to resent the wrongful influence and power that Giacomo had on Forlí.

In Renaissance Italy, there was a difference between a “good mother” and a “cruel mother” depending on the life that a widow chose afterwards. A “good mother” would not remarry and would play both roles as a mother and a father figure to her children. A “cruel mother” would put herself and her interests above her children by remarrying. This would be considered abandonment of her children because of the consequences that the children are faced with behind a new family and new father figure from their mother remarrying. Sometimes the widow would take her dowry and actually abandon her children to the paternal kin. Along with Caterina's secret marriage to Giacomo and Giacomo's cruelty towards Caterina's children, Caterina was seemingly taking on the identity as a "cruel mother" in the eyes of Renaissance Italy. Instead of focusing on ruling Forlí, she let her relationship with Giacomo get in the way, which made her people feel uneasy. Caterina's relationship with Giacomo not only put her children in jeopardy, but also the social order of Forlì.

Gian Antonio Ghetti and some of Caterina's own children formed a conspiracy. On the evening of 27 August 1495, Caterina, Giacomo Feo, and their entourage were returning from a hunt. Caterina, her daughter Bianca Riario and some of her ladies-in-waiting rode in a carriage, followed on horseback by Giacomo, Ottaviano, and his brother Cesare and many staffieri and soldiers. Agents of the conspiracy attacked and mortally wounded Giacomo. The same day, Ghetti went to Caterina, thinking that she had secretly given the order to kill Giacomo. Caterina was unaware of the plot, and her revenge was terrible. When her first husband was murdered, she avenged his death according to the justice of the time; now she reacted with vindictive fury. She was not satisfied with mere executions: their deaths had to be among the most cruel and painful. Again, her relationship and strong feelings towards Giacomo got in the way of her thinking clearly. By using the power she had and not thinking about the consequences and what her people would think of her, Catherine even slaughtered the children, infants and pregnant women of the conspirators. Thus Marin Sanudo, who says it is "cruelest":Thirty-eight people were executed for the crime - including Ghetti and his wife and children - and many others imprisoned or exiled. Caterina's fury blinded her to the politics that had inspired the plot. It had involved almost all the supporters of Ottaviano Riario, who were convinced that Caterina had given her tacit consent to the killing of the man who was considered the "usurper" of the state's rightful ruler. They had wanted to uphold the power of the Riario family. As a result of the massacre which followed the assassination of Giacomo Feo, Caterina lost, forever, the good will of her people.

Third marriage
In 1496, the ambassador of the Republic of Florence, Giovanni de' Medici il Popolano, paid a visit to Caterina. The second son of Pierfrancesco il Vecchio, he belonged to a collateral branch of the Medici family. Along with his older brother Lorenzo, he had been sent into exile because of his open hostility toward their cousin Piero, who succeeded his father Lorenzo il Magnifico in the government of Florence. In 1494, when Charles VIII invaded Italy, Piero was forced to sign a treaty which allowed the French army to move freely into the Kingdom of Naples. The people of Florence were liberated, deposed Piero and proclaimed a Republic. Giovanni and his brother were able to return to their homeland. They renounced the Medici surname and took the name of "Popolano". The Florentine government appointed Giovanni as ambassador to Forlì.

Shortly after coming to Forlì, Giovanni and his entourage were housed in the apartments adjacent to Caterina's in the fortress of Ravaldino. The rumours of a possible marriage between Giovanni and Caterina and that Ottaviano Riario had accepted the post of Condottiero from Florence threatened the Venetians, and alarmed the lords of the League and the Duke of Milan.

Caterina could not hide her wedding plans and her own feelings from her uncle Ludovico; she truly fell in love with the handsome, charming, and intelligent Giovanni. The situation differed from the previous one as this time Caterina had the approval of her children and she also obtained the consent of her uncle. The marriage of two people from such powerful families, however, was likely to arouse opposition, so they were wed in secret in September 1497.

In April 1498, Caterina bore Giovanni a son, the last of her children. The child was baptised as Ludovico after his mother's uncle, the Duke of Milan, but later he became known by the name Giovanni delle Bande Nere.

Meanwhile, affairs between Florence and Venice were getting worse and Caterina, who occupied the main route between the two cities, prepared her defenses. She sent a contingent of knights to the aid of Florence, led by Giovanni and her eldest son, Ottaviano Riario, accompanied by men she had trained herself.

Giovanni became seriously ill and was compelled to leave the battlefield and return to Forlì. There, despite treatment, his condition deteriorated and he was transferred to Santa Maria in Bagno, where he hoped for a miraculous recovery. On 14 September 1498, Giovanni died in the presence of Caterina, who had been summoned urgently to attend him. Giovanni's death left Caterina alone to face the Borgias.

Defense against Venice
After having returned to Forlì in order to make preparations for the defense of her states, Caterina was occupied by military concerns, especially logistics. Training the militia was executed by the Countess in person. To find additional money and troops, she wrote to her uncle Ludovico, the Republic of Florence and the neighbouring states who were her allies. Only the Marquis of Mantua and Ludovico il Moro sent a small contingent of soldiers. Ludovico invited her to be patient, because, although he said "some bad words", they could not find a better leader than he was.

After an initial attack by the Venetians, which inflicted severe destruction, Caterina's army managed to outmanoeuvre them. Afterwards, the war continued with minor skirmishes until the Venetians were able to circumvent Forlì to reach Florence by another route.

Because of this staunch defence, Caterina Sforza gained the nickname of "" ('The Tiger').

Capture by Cesare Borgia
In the meantime, Louis XII had succeeded to the French throne. Louis claimed the rights both to the Duchy of Milan as a grandson of Valentina Visconti, and to the Kingdom of Naples as heir to the House of Anjou. Before starting his campaign in Italy, Louis XII secured an alliance with Savoy, the Republic of Venice, and Pope Alexander VI. In the summer of 1499, he came to Italy with a formidable army; without having to fight a single battle, he occupied Piedmont, as well as Genoa and Cremona. On 6 October, he settled in Milan, which had been abandoned the previous month by Duke Ludovico, who fled to the Tyrol under the protection of his nephew-by-marriage Emperor Maximilian I.

Alexander VI allied himself with Louis XII in return for the King's support in establishing Alexander's son Cesare Borgia, the Duke of Valentinois, as ruler in Romagna. Alexander issued a papal bull on 9 March 1499 to invalidate the investiture of the feudal lords, including Caterina.

When the French army left Milan with Cesare to begin the conquest of Romagna, Ludovico il Moro regained the Duchy with the help of the Austrians.

Caterina sought relief from Florence against the approaching French army, but Florence was threatened by the Pope, so she was left alone to defend herself. She immediately began to recruit and train many soldiers and began to store weapons, ammunition and food. She reinforced the defenses, especially that of Ravaldino where she resided and which was already considered impenetrable. She also sent her children to Florence.

On 24 November, Cesare Borgia arrived in Imola. The city gates were opened by the inhabitants, and he was able to take possession, after having conquered the fortress where the castellan Dionigi Naldi of Brisighella had resisted for several days. After seeing what had happened there, Caterina asked the people of Forlì if they also wanted to capitulate to Borgia, or if they wanted to be defended and endure the resulting siege. Because the people hesitated in answering, Caterina absolved the citizens of Forlì of their oath of fealty, and sealed herself in Ravaldino.

On 19 December, the Duke of Valentinois took possession of Forlì and began the siege of the fortress. Caterina repeatedly refused all offers of peace, from Cesare and from Cardinal Riario. In response, Cesare offered 10,000 ducats for her, dead or alive. Caterina tried to capture Cesare when he came near the fortress to talk to her, but the attempt failed.

For several days the artillery of both factions engaged in a mutual bombardment: Caterina's cannon inflicted heavy losses on the French army, but the French artillery damaged the defences of the main fortress. What was destroyed during the day was rebuilt during the night.

Caterina's solitary resistance was admired throughout all Italy; Niccolò Machiavelli reports that many songs and epigrams were composed in her honour. All were lost except that of Marsilio Compagnon.

As time passed without decisive results, Cesare changed his tactics. His troops bombarded the walls of the fortress continuously, even at night. After six days, they opened two breaches in the walls. On 12 January 1500, his forces stormed the fortress. The bloody battle was quick and decisive, and Caterina continued to resist, fighting with weapons in hand until she was taken prisoner. Among the gentlemen who were caught together with her, was her secretary, Marcantonio Baldraccani. Immediately she surrendered herself to Antoine Bissey (the bailli of Dijon) as a prisoner of the French, as she knew there was a law that prevented French forces from holding women as prisoners of war.

According to Machiavelli, the defense operations were misdirected by Giovanni da Casale:  "The poorly built fortress and the scant prudence of the defender, therefore, brought disgrace to the magnanimous enterprise of the Countess ...".

Rome
Cesare obtained custody of Caterina from the French general, Yves d'Allègre, promising that he would treat her not as a prisoner but as a guest. Caterina and her entourage were therefore forced to go with the army that was preparing to conquer Pesaro. The conquest had to be postponed because on 5 February Ludovico il Moro returned to Milan, forcing French troops to turn back.

Cesare departed alone with the papal army for Rome, where he took Caterina. In Rome, she was held in the Belvedere Palace. Towards the end of March, Caterina tried to escape but she was discovered and immediately imprisoned at Castel Sant'Angelo.

In the prison of Castel Sant'Angelo
To justify Caterina's imprisonment, Pope Alexander VI accused her of trying to kill him in November 1499 with letters impregnated with poison, as a response to the papal bull which had deprived the countess of her fiefdoms.

Even today it is not known if the accusation was founded or not. Machiavelli believed that Caterina had tried to poison the Pope, while other historians, such as Jacob Burckhardt and Ferdinand Gregorovius, are not certain. An inconclusive and unfinished trial took place, and Caterina remained imprisoned until 30 June 1501, when she was released by Yves d'Allègre, who had come to Rome with the army of Louis XII for the conquest of the Kingdom of Naples. Alexander VI alleged that Caterina signed documents renouncing all of her fiefs, because in the meantime his son Cesare, with the acquisition of Pesaro, Rimini, and Faenza, was appointed Duke of Romagna.

After a brief stay in the residence of Cardinal Riario, Caterina embarked from Livorno to Florence, where her children were waiting for her.

Florence
In Florence, Caterina lived in the villas which had belonged to her third husband Giovanni de' Medici, often staying at the Villa Medici di Castello. Soon, she complained of being mistreated and living in a strained financial situation.

For many years she conducted a legal battle against her brother-in-law Lorenzo de' Medici for the custody of her son Giovanni, who was entrusted to him during her imprisonment. The battle over Giovanni's custody, and inheritance, and loans with Medici continued on for four years. While she had to pay back her loans to Medici, she was able to regain guardianship of Giovani and his inheritance. In 1504, her son was finally returned to her, because the judge recognized that her confinement as a prisoner of war was not comparable to the detention of a criminal.

With the death of Pope Alexander VI on 18 August 1503, Cesare Borgia lost all his power. This reopened the possibility of restoring to power all the old feudal lords of the Romagna who had been deposed. Caterina lost no time in sending letters to adherents, and pleaded her case to Pope Julius II in her own name and that of her son Ottaviano Riario. The new Pope was favourable to restoring the lordships of Imola and Forlì to the Riarios, but the populace of both cities declared that a majority of the people opposed the return of the Countess, so that the domain passed instead to Antonio Maria Ordelaffi on 22 October 1503.

After having lost her last chance to return to her former political power with Imola and Forlì, Caterina spent the last years of her life dedicated to her children, in particular to her youngest son Giovanni (her favourite and the most like her in personality and character). She also conducted a series of experiments in alchemy, the results of which were recorded in a manuscript titled "Gli Experimenti de la Ex.ma S.r Caterina da Furlj Matre de lo inllux.mo S.r Giouanni de Medici", or "Gli Experimenti". The book, dating back to 1500, contains a total of 454 recipes, roughly 66 of which are cosmetic related, 358 medicinal, and 38 alchemical. Her experimental activities situate her at the origins of a Medici interest that stretched well into the seventeenth century.

Death and burial
In April 1509, Caterina's health declined and was stricken by a severe case of pneumonia. She appeared to have recovered, but had a relapse of the disease, after which she made her will and arranged her burial. At the age of forty-six years, "The Tiger of Forlì", who had "frightened all of Romagna", died on 28 May 1509. Her body was placed in a small tomb in the chapel of Le Murate in Florence, a convent of nuns whom Caterina had befriended during her time in that city, and where she had kept a cell as a spiritual retreat. During the 1830s, the nuns were forced to leave the property, and in 1845 it was redesigned as a prison. Sometime during this renovation, Caterina's bones disappeared.

Appearance and personality 
This is how the Florentine historian Bartolomeo Cerretani describes her:
"She was wise, animose, great: complex, beautiful face, she spoke little. She wore a satin robe with two arms of trawl, a black velvet caper on the French, a man's girdle, and scarsella full of golden ducats; a sickle for the use of retort next to it, and among the soldiers at the foot, and on horseback was feared much, because that woman with weapons in hand was proud and cruel. She was the non-legitimate daughter of Count Francesco Sforza, the first captain of his time and to whom she was very similar in soul and daring, and she did not lack, being adorned with singular virtue, of some vice not small nor vulgar."

Marin Sanudo called her "female almost virago, cruelest", in relation to the massacre she made of the children and pregnant women of the conspirators, following the death of her second husband Giacomo Feo.

The leader  says she is "cunning", ready to change parties on the occasion, but specifies that "to be a woman she is not without fear of her own things".

The future cardinal Bernardo Dovizi da Bibbiena, in a letter in which he narrates to Piero de' Medici the "strange takeover" of Caterina with the Duke of Calabria Ferrandino d'Aragona (which took place on September 23, 1494), described her ugly in the face, bringing back in this the impressions of Ferrandino himself. In fact, although Caterina had a reputation among posterity as a woman of great beauty, the medals of the time depict a woman with masculine traits and somewhat corpulent.

Around 1502, according to an informant of Isabella d'Este, Caterina was "so fat that I could not make the comparison". Corpulence was, moreover, very common within the Sforza family: Caterina's father Galeazzo Maria himself, to whom Caterina was very similar, did not wear the cuirass that would perhaps have saved him from death - which he went to meet - "so as not to seem too fat".

He had also inherited from the Sforza the typical important nose, slightly bead, and the protruding chin. Her hair had to be wavy and it seems that she kept it gathered behind her head, but it is not known for sure if she was blonde and clear in natural complexion or if she obtained these results through her own mixtures. This does not alter the fact that the blond was very frequent among members of the Sforza family.

Issue
From her first marriage with Girolamo Riario, Caterina had six children:
 Bianca (b. Rome, March 1478 – d. after 1522), married firstly in 1494, Astorre III Manfredi, Lord of Faenza (d. 1502), and secondly in 1503, Troilo I de' Rossi (d. 1521), the first Marchese di San Secondo From her second marriage, she had nine children.
 Ottaviano (b. Rome, 31 August 1479 – d. Bologna, 6 October 1523), Lord of Imola and Forlì (1488–99), later Bishop of Volterra and Viterbo
 Cesare (b. Rome, 24 August 1480 – d. Rome, 18 December 1540), Archbishop of Pisa and Patriarch of Alexandria
 Giovanni Livio (b. Forlì, 30 October 1484 – d. 1496)
 Galeazzo Maria (b. Forlì, 4 December 1485 – d. Bologna, 1557), married in 1504, Maria Giovanna della Rovere (b. Senigallia, 1486 – d. Bologna 1538), Dowager Lady of Camerino, and eldest sister of Francesco Maria I della Rovere, Duke of Urbino. They had a daughter, Giulia, and a son, Giulio (d. 1565). Their descendants, who later received a ducal title, became extinct in the male line with Francesco Maria Riario della Rovere in 1676.
 Francesco, called "Sforzino" (b. Imola, 17 August 1487 – d. after 1509), Bishop of Lucca

From her second marriage with Giacomo Feo, Caterina had one son:
 Bernardino (later Carlo) (b. April 1489 – d. 1509)

From her third marriage to Giovanni de' Medici, Caterina had one son:
 Ludovico (b. Forlì, 6 April 1498 – d. Mantua, 30 November 1526), renamed Giovanni after the death of his father, one of the greatest condottieri of his time and a national hero, known as "Giovanni delle Bande Nere". He married Maria Salviati (17 July 1499 – 29 December 1543), the daughter of Jacopo Salviati and Lucrezia di Lorenzo de' Medici. Cosimo I de' Medici, Grand Duke of Tuscany (1519–1574) was their son.

In June 1537, 28 years after Caterina's death, her grandson Cosimo de' Medici, the only son of her own son Giovanni, became the Duke of Florence and in 1569, the Grand Duke of Tuscany. Through him, Caterina was the direct ancestress of the later Grand Dukes of Tuscany, the Dukes of Modena and Reggio, and the Kings of Spain and France.

Legacy
In her book The Warrior Queens: Boadicea's Chariot, British historian Antonia Fraser presents Caterina Sforza as a contrasting figure to her contemporary Isabella I of Castile. Fraser points out that whilst the murders ordered by Caterina were no worse than the massacres ordered by Isabella, historians have been much harsher in their judgment of the former. Fraser accounts for this by pointing out that Isabella's actions were sanctioned by the Church, as they were carried out in the name of Catholicism, whilst Caterina's were motivated by the personal, secular desire to preserve her property and rights.

Experimenti

Caterina Sforza had a thirst for knowledge and had interests in alchemy, cosmetics, and medicine. She crafted a manuscript containing 454 recipes, with the recipes and experiments listed in alphabetical order. The recipes within her manuscript can be divided into three categories: “Lisci” (Cosmetics), “Chimica” (Chemistry), and “Medicine” (Medicine). Some of her medicinal recipes include remedies for lice, fever, and to heal wounds. She created cosmetic recipes for perfume, and methods to lighten skin and hair. Many of the experiment's cross categories as the cosmetic and medical recipes relied on the same procedures and ingredients as the chemical recipes.

When Sforza relocated to Forlì in 1484, she continued her experiments. She had medicinal gardens constructed where she was able to develop the ingredients she needed for her recipes. Along the exterior border of the fortress, an extensive garden was developed where she could grow various fruit trees.

After her death, her manuscript was passed down to her son, Giovanni dalle Bande Nere. It was then passed down from generation to generation and stayed within the Medici family. The manuscript eventually was lost. In the 19th century, Pier Desiderio Pasolini (1844-1920), a descendant of Caterina Sforza and a historian from Ravenna, spent approximately five years acquiring documents written by Sforza. He then went on to publish the majority of her manuscript titled “Experimenti”.

In fiction
In the 2005 novel "The Borgia Bride" by Jeanne Kalogridis, Caterina befriends the novel's main protagonist, Sancha of Aragon, while both women are imprisoned in the Castel San Angelo. Both plot the downfall of Pope Alexander Borgia and his murderous son Cesare.
Caterina serves as the supposed inspiration for Catalina, a small-time criminal in Grand Theft Auto: San Andreas, who later rises to power as a drug lord in the events of Grand Theft Auto III, which released before San Andreas.
 Caterina is the subject of the 2010 historical novel Scarlet Contessa, by Jeanne Kalogridis.
 In the 2011 Showtime series The Borgias she is portrayed by Gina McKee; the show takes significant dramatic liberties with the details surrounding the siege undertaken in the name of Alexander VI. Her capture by Cesare Borgia is the final episode of Season 3, which was also the last-ever episode due to the show's cancellation.
 In the series Borgia, also known as Borgia: Faith and Fear, she is portrayed by Valentina Cervi.
 In the third season of Medici (TV Series), she appears as a young woman, married to her first husband, the major antagonist Girolamo Riario. She is portrayed by Rose Williams.
 Caterina Sforza appears as a minor character in the 2009 historically set video game Assassin's Creed II and its novelization, Assassin's Creed: Renaissance. She plays a larger role in "The Battle of Forlì" downloadable content pack, wherein she is aided in the titular battle by the game's protagonist Ezio Auditore. Caterina also appears in the 2010 sequel game Assassin's Creed: Brotherhood and its novelization, as a sometime love interest to Ezio Auditore. Three missions are dedicated to Ezio rescuing her from her imprisonment in the Castel Sant'Angelo.
 A fictionalised account of Caterina Sforza's capture by Cesare Borgia features in Sarah Dunant's 2013 novel Blood & Beauty.

In Machiavelli
Caterina is one of the few women discussed by Machiavelli at length. Specifically because of the incident of her having shown her genitalia in regaining the fortress of Ravaldino. This skirt account, although being the best known version of the events, is believed to have been created by Machiavelli and not a historical fact. He tells it in multiple occasions: first in the Discourses on Livy, and lastly in Florentine Histories. Machiavelli himself tells the account differently in Florentine Histories, omitting completely the whole skirt raising situation replaced simply with a reply to her children's captors that she could create more, and thus they were of no consequence to her.

When it comes to historical facts, we have a few accounts mentioning the event shortly after it occurred. None of which mention any skirt incident and instead talk about the true wisdom and political astuteness of Caterina reverting a losing situation into one where she was back in control. In all accounts she responds to the threats against her children with words and not actions. She mentions how her eldest son is somewhere safe and that she is at that moment pregnant. The pregnancy is believed to have been a rouse but with the conspirators not having reinforcements, Caterina's on her way, and the bargaining chip that were her kids effectively rendered mute in addition to her threats of vengeance for the murder of her husband, they had no choice but to retreat. Caterina would later on exact her vengeance on all involved parties.

Going back to Machiavelli, according to Julia L. Hairston in her journal article Skirting the issue: Machiavelli's Caterina Sforza, his addition of the skirt situation seems to have been for dramatic appeal, to defeminize her by recounting an atypical behavior of a woman and a mother, and also to separate this action as a response towards the threat to her children and attribute it to a sentiment of indifference. Elizabeth Lev wrote on the matter in her biography of Caterina Sforza, The Tigress of Forli. Lev took the position that Machiavelli's account on the matter, being quite vulgar, may in fact have been more a reflection of his own dislike of Caterina. Indeed, Machiavelli had met the countess as a young diplomat and had not fared well.

See also 
 House of Sforza

Notes

References

Sources

Further reading 

 Demi, Cinzia: Caterina Sforza, Fara, 2010.
 Machiavelli: The Discourses, English translation by Fr Leslie J. Walker, S.J. (1929). The countess is featured in Bk III, Ch 6 in relating examples of dangers that can arise subsequent to a successful conspiracy.
 Marchi, Cesare: Giovanni delle Bande Nere, Milano, 1981.
 Lev, Elizabeth: The Tigress of Forli: Renaissance Italy's Most Courageous And Notorious Countess, Caterina Riario Sforza De' Medici. Boston: Houghton Mifflin Harcourt, 2011. .
 Perria, Antonio: I terribili Sforza. Trionfo e fine di una grande dinastia, Milano, Sugar Co Edizioni Srl, 1981.
 Verrier, Frédérique: Caterina Sforza et Machiavel ou l'origine du monde, Vecchiarelli, 2010.

External links 
 The Identification of Caterina Sforza in Renaissance Paintings through Symbolism.

1463 births
1509 deaths
Women in 15th-century warfare
16th-century Italian women
Nobility from Milan
Lords of Forlì
People of Tuscan descent
Caterina
15th-century women rulers
15th-century Italian nobility
16th-century Italian nobility
Italian countesses
Women in medieval European warfare
Renaissance women
Women in war in Italy
Deaths from pneumonia in Tuscany